Round The Clock is an English internet radio service from China Radio International.  The broadcast basically rotates between China Drive and the following weekly programs:

 Monday: Front Line
 Tuesday: Biz-China
 Wednesday: China Horizons
 Thursday: Voices from Other Lands
 Friday: Life In China
 Saturday: Listeners' Garden
 Sunday: In the Spotlight

(Source: http://en.chinabroadcast.cn/radio/schedule/radio_roundtheclock.htm)

On the weekends when China Drive is not available, the following programs are also broadcast:
 CRI Roundup
 China Roots
 Reports from Developing Counties
 China Beat

External links
 Article title

Radio stations in China
China Radio International